English Electric (EE) was a British industrial manufacturer.

English Electric may also refer to:

 English Electric (album), a 2013 album by Orchestral Manoeuvres in the Dark (OMD)
 English Electric Part One, a 2012 album by Big Big Train
 English Electric Part Two, a 2013 album by Big Big Train